The Battle of Cyców took place during the Polish-Bolshevik War on 15 and 16 August 1920. It is one of the battles that constitute a larger operation commonly referred to as the battle of Warsaw.

Background
The Polish plan for the Battle of Warsaw was based on two assumptions: that Warsaw would withstand a direct assault by Red Army's forces and that the corps-sized Assault Group under direct command of Gen. Józef Piłsudski gain enough time to concentrate behind Wieprz river and prepare a counter-offensive. For the latter to be possible, the Polish forces near Lublin and Zamość (Polish 3rd Army) had to prevent the Bolshevik South-Western Front from reaching the battlefield.

Battle
On 15 August the forces of 58th Rifle Division (514th and 155th Rifle Regiments, reinforced with cavalry and artillery, some 1,550 first-line troops and 235 cavalrymen all together) arrived to the area north of Cyców. The Polish forces in the area consisted of elements of the 4th Cavalry Brigade (Third Silesian Uhlan Regiment and 7th Regiment of Lublin Uhlans), reinforced with mounted artillery battalion and two reserve battalions of infantry. All together, Maj. Cyprian Bystram (CO of 3rd Uhlans' Regiment and temporary commander of the Polish 4th Brigade) had 928 cavalrymen and 900 infantrymen at his command.

The Russian forces assaulted the Polish infantry along the road leading towards Lublin, near Garbatówka. The Polish units, composed mainly of rear echelon troops and lightly wounded servicemen from nearby field hospitals, offered stiff resistance for the remainder of the day. Despite numerical superiority, it was not until the following morning that the Russians finally broke through the Polish lines and entered Cyców, in pursuit of the fleeing remnants of the Polish infantry battalions. At Głębokie however, the Polish infantry made another stand, this time helped by mobile artillery of the 2nd Artillery Battalion.

The Russian forces were stopped and Polish cavalry arrived to the battlefield just in time. Before the Russians could regroup, they were charged by the two cavalry regiments and routed. The remnants of the Russian division were surrounded the following day by the 3rd Legions Infantry Division and annihilated.

The battle of Cyców is featured on the Tomb of the Unknown Soldier in Warsaw.

Conflicts in 1920
1920 in Poland
Cycow
August 1920 events